Colonel Van Perkins Winder (1809-1854) was an American sugar planter in the Antebellum South.

Early life
Van Perkins Winder was born on June 3, 1809, in Natchez, Mississippi. His father was Dr Thomas Jones Winder (1772-1818) and his mother, Harriet Handy (1786-1820). He was a descendant of Colonel Nathaniel Littleton (1605-1654).

Career
Winder acquired the Ducros Plantation in the Terrebonne Parish, Louisiana in 1845. That same year, he purchased slaves from Thomas Butler.

Personal life
He married Martha Grundy, the daughter of Felix Grundy. By 1860, she owned 202 slaves and 4,550 acres of land.

Death
He died of yellow fever on November 8, 1854, at his Ducross Plantation in Louisiana. He was buried at the Nashville City Cemetery in Nashville, Tennessee alongside his wife.

References

1809 births
1854 deaths
People from Natchez, Mississippi
People from Terrebonne Parish, Louisiana
American planters
Sugar plantation owners
American slave owners